Promises to Keep is a 1988 documentary film produced by Ginny Durrin. It was nominated for an Academy Award for Best Documentary Feature.

References

External links

Promises to Keep at Durrin Productions

1988 films
English-language Canadian films
American documentary films
Canadian documentary films
1988 documentary films
1980s English-language films
1980s American films
1980s Canadian films